In the statistical physics of spin glasses and other systems with quenched disorder, the replica trick is a mathematical technique based on the application of the formula:

or:

where 
 is most commonly the partition function, or a similar thermodynamic function.

This is physically equivalent to averaging over  copies or replicas of the system, hence the name.

The crux of the replica trick is that while the disorder averaging is done assuming  to be an integer, to recover the disorder-averaged logarithm one must send  continuously to zero. This apparent contradiction at the heart of the replica trick has never been formally resolved, however in all cases where the replica method can be compared with other exact solutions, the methods lead to the same results. (To prove that the replica trick works, one would have to prove that Carlson's theorem holds, that is, that the ratio  is of exponential type less than pi.)

It is occasionally necessary to require the additional property of replica symmetry breaking (RSB) in order to obtain physical results, which is associated with the breakdown of ergodicity.

General formulation 
It is generally used for computations involving analytic functions (can be expanded in power series).

A particular case which is of great use in physics is in averaging the thermodynamic free energy,

,

The partition function is then given by

.

Notice that if we were calculating just  (or more generally, any power of ) and not its logarithm which we wanted to average, the resulting integral (assuming a Gaussian distribution) is just

,

a standard Gaussian integral which can be easily computed (e.g. completing the square).

To calculate the free energy, we use the replica trick:which reduces the complicated task of averaging the logarithm to solving a relatively simple Gaussian integral, provided  is an integer.

Clearly, such an argument poses many mathematical questions, and the resulting formalism for performing the limit  typically introduces many subtleties.

When using mean-field theory to perform one's calculations, taking this limit often requires introducing extra order parameters, a property known as "replica symmetry breaking" which is closely related to ergodicity breaking and slow dynamics within disorder systems.

Physical applications 
The replica trick is used in determining ground states of statistical mechanical systems, in the mean-field approximation. Typically, for systems in which the determination of ground state is easy, one can analyze fluctuations near the ground state. Otherwise one uses the replica method.  An example is the case of a quenched disorder in a system like a spin glass with different types of magnetic links between spins, leading to many different configurations of spins having the same energy.

In the statistical physics of systems with quenched disorder, any two states with the same realization of the disorder (or in case of spin glasses, with the same distribution of ferromagnetic and antiferromagnetic bonds) are called replicas of each other. For systems with quenched disorder, one typically expects that macroscopic quantities will be self-averaging, whereby any macroscopic quantity for a specific realization of the disorder will be indistinguishable from the same quantity calculated by averaging over all possible realizations of the disorder. Introducing replicas allows one to perform this average over different disorder realizations.

In the case of a spin glass, we expect the free energy per spin (or any self averaging quantity) in the thermodynamic limit to be independent of the particular values of ferromagnetic and antiferromagnetic couplings between individual sites, across the lattice. So, we explicitly find the free energy as a function of the disorder parameter (in this case, parameters of the distribution of ferromagnetic and antiferromagnetic bonds) and average the free energy over all realizations of the disorder (all values of the coupling between sites, each with its corresponding probability, given by the distribution function). As free energy takes the form:

To perform the averaging over the logarithm function, the replica trick comes in handy, in replacing the logarithm with its limit form mentioned above. In this case, the quantity  represents the joint partition function of  identical systems.

REM: the easiest replica problem
The random energy model (REM) is one of the simplest models of statistical mechanics of disordered systems, and probably the simplest model to show the meaning and power of the replica trick to the level 1 of replica symmetry breaking. The model is especially suitable for this introduction because an exact result by a different procedure is known, and the replica trick can be proved to work by crosschecking of results.

See also
The cavity method is an alternative method, often of simpler use than the replica method, for studying disordered mean-field problems. It has been devised to deal with models on locally tree-like graphs.

Another alternative method is the supersymmetric method. The use of the supersymmetry method provides a mathematical rigorous alternative to the replica trick, but only in non-interacting systems. See for example the book: 

Also, it has been demonstrated  that the Keldysh technique provides a viable alternative to the replica approach.

Remarks

The above identity is easily understood via Taylor expansion:

References
 S Edwards (1971), "Statistical mechanics of rubber". In Polymer networks: structural and mechanical properties, (eds A. J. Chompff & S. Newman). New York: Plenum Press,  ISBN 978-1-4757-6210-5.
 M Mezard, G Parisi & M Virasoro, "Spin Glass Theory and Beyond", World Scientific, 1987
Papers on Spin Glasses

Books on Spin Glasses

References to other approaches

Statistical mechanics